Joshua Lee Norman (born July 27, 1980) is a former American football tight end who played in the National Football League (NFL). He was signed by the San Diego Chargers as an undrafted free agent in 2002. He played college football at Oklahoma.

References

External links
Oklahoma Sooners bio

1980 births
Living people
American football tight ends
American football wide receivers
Oklahoma Sooners football players
San Diego Chargers players
Players of American football from Texas
People from Midland, Texas